East Timor competed at the 2010 Summer Youth Olympics, the inaugural Youth Olympic Games, held in Singapore from 14 August to 26 August 2010.

Athletics

Boys
Track and Road Events

Taekwondo

Girls

References

External links
Competitors List: East Timor – Singapore 2010 official site

Summer Youth Olympics
Nations at the 2010 Summer Youth Olympics
East Timor at multi-sport events
East Timor at the Youth Olympics